Tingena opaca is a species of moth in the family Oecophoridae. It is endemic to New Zealand and has been observed in the southern parts of the South Island. Adults of this species are on the wing in December.

Taxonomy 
This species was first described by Alfred Philpott using specimens collected at Bluff in November and December and named Borkhausenia opaca. George Hudson discussed this species in his 1928 book The butterflies and moths of New Zealand under that name. In 1988 J. S. Dugdale placed this species in the genus Tingena. The male holotype specimen is held in the New Zealand Arthropod Collection.

Description 
 
Philpott described this species as follows:

This species can be distinguished by its unusual tornal mark and the orange-red scales heavily dusted over the forewings.

Distribution
This species is endemic to New Zealand and has been observed in the southern parts of the South Island.

Behaviour
The adults of this species are on the wing in December.

References

Oecophoridae
Moths of New Zealand
Moths described in 1926
Endemic fauna of New Zealand
Taxa named by Alfred Philpott
Endemic moths of New Zealand